Pseudopostega epactaea is a moth of the family Opostegidae. It was described by Edward Meyrick in 1907. It is known from Sri Lanka.

Adults have been recorded in February and March.

References

Opostegidae
Moths described in 1907